Presbyterian Church of Korea (PCK) was a Protestant denomination based in South Korea; it is currently separated into many branches.

History 
The first Korean Presbyterian church was founded by Seo Sang-ryun in Hwanghae province in 1884. Shortly thereafter, several foreign Presbyterian missionaries arrived on the peninsula, including Horace Allen, Horace G. Underwood, and Henry Davies.

Like other Christian groups, the Korean Presbyterians such as Gil Seon-ju were closely involved in the peaceful March 1st Movement for Korean independence in 1919.

By 1937, the Presbyterian churches were largely independent of financial support from the United States. Presbyterianism in Korea was reconstructed after World War II in 1947. The church adopted the name the Reformed Church in Korea.

In the 1950s, the church suffered tensions because of issues of theology, ecumenism, and worship. The first of these occurred in 1952, over issues related to shinto shrine worship, resulted in the formation of the Presbyterian Church in Korea (Kosin). In the second in 1953, the "Presbyterian Church of the Republic of Korea" separated from the PCK. In the third schism in 1959, the Presbyterian Church of Korea broke into two equal sections: the Presbyterian Church of Korea (TongHap) and The Presbyterian Church in Korea (HapDong).

General assembly

See also
 Christianity in Korea
 Presbyterianism
 Presbyterianism in South Korea

References

Further reading
 Clark, Donald N. Christianity in Modern Korea (University Press of America, 1986)
 Grayson, James H. Korea—A Religious History (Routledge Curzon, 2002)
 Kang, Wi Jo. Christ and Caesar in Modern Korea: A History of Christianity and Politics ( State University of New York Press, 1997)
 Latourette, Kenneth Scott. Christianity in a Revolutionary Age: Vol. 5: The Twentieth century outside Europe (1962) pp 412–23
 Lee, Timothy S. "A Political Factor in the Rise of Protestantism in Korea: Protestantism and the 1919 March First Movement," Church History 2000. 69#1 pp 116–42. in JSTOR
 Mullins, Mark, and Richard Fox Young, eds. Perspectives on Christianity in Korea and Japan: The Gospel and Culture in East Asia (Edwin Mellen, 1995)
 Park, Chung-shin. Protestantism and Politics in Korea (U. of Washington Press, 2003)

 

Presbyterianism in South Korea
Religious organizations established in 1884